St George's Church is in the village of Carrington, Trafford, Greater Manchester, England.  It is recorded in the National Heritage List for England as a designated Grade II* listed building, but is now redundant and in the care of the Churches Conservation Trust.  It stands in a relatively isolated position south of the Manchester Ship Canal, along the northern edge of the Carrington Moss industrial estate.

History
The church was built by Isaac Shaw in 1757–59 for Mary, Countess of Stamford as a chapel of ease to serve the hamlets of Partington and Carrington.  A chancel was added in 1872.  The building is no longer used for worship.  St George's was vested in the Trust on 1 March 1990.

The vicar of St Mary's, Partington and Carrington is responsible for the churchyard.  Clearance work in 2008 uncovered the graves of two soldiers who had died during the First World War.
Their graves are registered by the Commonwealth War Graves Commission.

Architecture
The church is built in brick with a stone slate roof.  The plan consists of a four-bay nave with a small chancel.  Each bay has a round-arched window.  The chancel has a Venetian window and a hipped roof. Formerly a cupola was on the west end but this has been removed.

The box pews, including two family pews, are original.   The font is based on a marble wash bowl. The wooden reredos dates from around 1872.  The pulpit is a three-decker.

See also

Grade II* listed buildings in Greater Manchester
Listed buildings in Carrington, Greater Manchester
List of churches in Greater Manchester
List of churches preserved by the Churches Conservation Trust in Northern England

References

Church of England church buildings in Greater Manchester
Grade II* listed churches in Greater Manchester
Churches completed in 1759
18th-century Church of England church buildings
Churches completed in 1872
Churches in Trafford
Diocese of Chester
Churches preserved by the Churches Conservation Trust
Former churches in Greater Manchester
Commonwealth War Graves Commission cemeteries in England